Erik Felipe Barbosa Cardoso (born 3 March 2000) is a Brazilian sprinter. He competed in the 60 metres at the 2022 World Indoor Championships without advancing from the first round. In addition, he has won multiple medals at regional level.

Personal bests
100 m: 10.01 (wind: +2.0 m/s) –  Bragança Paulista, 4 Sep 2021
200 m: 20.86 (wind: -0.1 m/s) –  Bragança Paulista, 15 Sep 2018
Indoor
60 metres – 6.71 –  Cochabamba, 19 Feb 2022

International competitions

1 Did not start in the final

References

External links

2000 births
Living people
Brazilian male sprinters
People from Piracicaba
21st-century Brazilian people